Novaya Lyalya is a town and the administrative center of Novolyalinsky District in Sverdlovsk Oblast, Russia, located on the ,  north of Yekaterinburg, the administrative center of the oblast. Population:

History
It was founded in 1723 as a settlement around a copper-melting plant (which closed by 1744). It was granted town status in 1938.

Administrative and municipal status
Within the framework of administrative divisions, Novaya Lyalya serves as the administrative center of Novolyalinsky District. As an administrative division, it is, together with seven rural localities, incorporated within Novolyalinsky District as the Town of Novaya Lyalya. As a municipal division, the town of Novaya Lyalya together with sixteen rural localities in Novolyalinsky District are incorporated as Novolyalinsky Urban Okrug.

References

Notes

Sources

Cities and towns in Sverdlovsk Oblast
Populated places established in 1723
1723 establishments in the Russian Empire